Tilamuta is a town in Sulawesi in Indonesia and is the seat of the Regency of Boalemo

Populated places in Sulawesi
Regency seats of Gorontalo